The pharyngeal muscles are a group of muscles that form the pharynx, which is posterior to the oral cavity, determining the shape of its lumen, and affecting its sound properties as the primary resonating cavity.

The pharyngeal muscles (involuntary skeletal) push food into the esophagus. There are two muscular layers of the pharynx: the outer circular layer and the inner longitudinal layer.

The outer circular layer includes:
 Superior constrictor muscle
 Middle constrictor muscle
 Inferior constrictor muscle
During swallowing, these muscles constrict to propel a bolus downwards (an involuntary process).

The inner longitudinal layer includes:
 Stylopharyngeus muscle
 Salpingopharyngeus muscle
 Palatopharyngeus muscle
During swallowing, these muscles act to shorten and widen the pharynx.

They are innervated by the pharyngeal branch of the vagus nerve (CN X) with the exception of the stylopharyngeus muscle which is innervated by the glossopharyngeal nerve (CN IX).

References

Muscles of the head and neck
Pharynx